Robert Gould Shaw II (sometimes referred to as RGS II) (June 16, 1872 – March 29, 1930) was a wealthy landowner, international polo player of the Myopia Hunt Club and socialite of the leisure class in the greater Boston area of Massachusetts. He was one of the prominent figures of the boom years at the turn of the century, sometimes called the Gilded Age.

Born in 1872 into one of the wealthiest and most influential families in Boston, he was a first cousin of Robert Gould Shaw. As an adult, RGS II gained a reputation for alcohol abuse and promiscuity. His first wife was Nancy Witcher Langhorne, and they had a son, Robert Gould Shaw III (called RGS III or "Bobby"). RGS II and Langhorne divorced after four years of marriage. She moved to England after some time, where she met and married Waldorf Astor, who later succeeded his father as Viscount.

RGS II married again and had four other sons, including Louis Agassiz Shaw II. Both of these sons suffered from depression, alcoholism, and legal difficulties. Bobby was arrested in England for homosexuality, and committed suicide in 1970. Louis Agassiz Shaw II murdered his maid in 1964. He was determined to be unfit for trial and was remanded instead to McLean Hospital, a psychiatric hospital where he resided for nearly the rest of his life.

Early life

RGS II was the youngest child of Quincy Adams Shaw and Pauline (née Agassiz) Shaw. Quincy was one of the wealthiest men in Massachusetts as a result of his investment in the Calumet and Hecla Mining Company. RGS II's four older siblings were Louis, Pauline, Marian, and Quincy Jr.

Quincy's side of the family had Anglo-American roots extending back to passengers on the Mayflower. His paternal grandparents were Robert G. Shaw and Elizabeth Willard (née Parkman) Shaw. His maternal grandfather, Louis Agassiz, was a prominent paleontologist, glaciologist, geologist, and scholar of the Earth's natural history who immigrated from Switzerland in 1846.

Shaw's relatives included granduncle George Parkman (who was killed by John White Webster in a highly publicized case), first cousin (once removed) Francis Parkman Jr. (a noted American historian and author of The Oregon Trail: Sketches of Prairie and Rocky-Mountain Life), uncle Alexander Emanuel Agassiz (who served as president of Calumet and Hecla Mining Company and president of the National Academy of Sciences), cousin Rodolphe Louis Agassiz (a ten goal polo champion), cousin Josephine Shaw (who married to Brig. Gen. Charles Russell Lowell III), and nephew Louis Agassiz Shaw, Jr. (who was a professor of physiology at Harvard Medical School and co-inventor of the first widely used iron lung).

Personal life

On October 27, 1897, RGS II married Nancy Witcher Langhorne (1879–1964) in New York City. She was the 18-year-old daughter of railroad millionaire Chiswell Dabney Langhorne and Nancy Witcher Keene. They had one son:

 Robert Gould Shaw III (1898–1970).

The marriage was unhappy for both and Shaw's friends accused her of being puritanical and rigid, while Nancy's friends contended that he was an alcoholic and a womanizer. Nancy left Shaw numerous times during their brief marriage, the first time during their honeymoon. In 1903, Nancy's mother died and she divorced him, returning to Mirador, her childhood home. After his ex-wife and son moved to England, Shaw had a limited role in his son Bobby's life.

In 1905, while a passenger on a trans-Atlantic ship to England, the recently divorced Nancy met Waldorf Astor, eldest son of William Waldorf Astor and Mary Dahlgren Paul of the Astor family. The couple were married in May 1906, settling in Cliveden, a present from his father and the Astor family estate in Taplow, Buckinghamshire, England. In 1919, Nancy ran for Parliament and won, becoming the first woman to sit as a Member of Parliament in the House of Commons.

Second marriage
Shaw was married to Mary Hannington (1874–1937) and they had four sons:

 Gould Shaw
 George Alexander Shaw
 Louis Agassiz Shaw II (1906–1987)
 Paul Agassiz Shaw (1912–1983)

Shaw purchased a tract of land in Oak Hill, Newton, shortly after the death of its owner, William Sumner Appleton in 1903 (father of William Sumner Appleton, Jr.). He commissioned Boston architect James Lovell Little, Jr. to design and construct several buildings on the property, including outbuildings of a carriage house and horse stable in 1910, a cow barn in 1912, and a primary residence (the Appleton/Shaw House) in 1912. As the Gilded Age gave way to the Progressive Era and eventually the Great Depression, the Shaw fortune collapsed.

Shaw died at the Plaza Hotel after a brief illness in 1930.

Legacy

The vacant and decaying Shaw estate in Newton was sold in 1939 to Dr. William Fitts Carlson. Carlson used the property as the new campus for Mount Ida Junior College. Adjoining tracts of land were converted into the Wells Avenue office park in the 1970s, and the Charles River Footpath (since renamed the Helen Heyn Riverway) in the 1990s.

In popular culture
Artist R. G. Harper Pennington in one of his paintings depicted a nude RGS II as the character "Little Billee" from the bohemian novel Trilby (1894) by George du Maurier. This painting hung in the bedroom of Henry Symes Lehr, the homosexual husband of Elizabeth Wharton Drexel.

In a 1982 episode of Masterpiece Theatre that chronicled the life of Nancy Astor, Pierce Brosnan portrayed RGS II as a profligate and promiscuous gambler. In this version, Nancy Langhorne Astor continued to love RGS II after her marriage to Waldorf Astor, but this has not been documented. For this performance, Brosnan was nominated for a Best Supporting Actor in 1985.

References

External links

City of Newton Massachusetts Atlas (1886): Section V, Ward 5. The location of the tract of land purchased by Robert Gould Shaw II in 1903 (property owned by William Sumner Appleton) is clearly visible on this 1886 map of Newton, Massachusetts.

1872 births
1930 deaths
19th-century American people
People from Boston
American socialites
Robert
American people of Swiss descent
American people of English descent